ATV (known as Andina de Televisión) is a Peruvian television network founded in 1959 and relaunched in 1983. The network is the flagship property of Grupo ATV, one of Peru's largest media and broadcasting companies.

History 
What is known today as ATV started in 1959 with Alfonso Pereyra as its first manager. After unsuccessful attempts to run it in the early 1970s and subsequent political turmoil in Peru, the station was closed; however, it became a TV Perú local station for the capital area.

By 1981, the channel was under new leadership. Carlos Tizón Pacheco, who financed the 1980 presidential campaign of President Fernando Belaúnde Terry, and then-president of local auto firm PROMASA, took over the channel frequency with his firm Andina de Radiodifusión, S.A., with test broadcasting commencing on May 9 the same year. After two years the channel returned to broadcasting on April 18, 1983, with President Terry presiding.

Since then the station has quickly gained a Peruvian audience by showing foreign films and broadcasting dramas, usually from Brazil. Until 1992 the station was known as Canal 9 (Channel 9), after its Lima, Peru VHF frequency, up until 1986 it had only been a local station, with national broadcasting starting only in 1987.

On January 14, 1992, due to the interconnection via satellite at the national level, the then denominated Channel 9 changes its name to ATV (abbreviation of Andina de Televisión).

The station is among the most watched television stations in Peru, often obtaining high ratings from past TV shows such as Magaly TV, a magazine and gossip show hosted by Peruvian journalist Magaly Medina.

ATV HD 
In November 2006, the Peruvian Minister of Transports and Communications published in Peru's official newspaper "El Peruano" a decree concerning Digital terrestrial television. In April 2007, ATV started to test their HD channel with American ATSC system on channel 30. Then when Peru adopted ISDB-T years later, ATV began testing ISDB-T broadcasts in the capital in September 2009. ATV's HD signal was officially released on March 31, 2010, 1 day after TV Perú, being the first Peruvian private television network to do that.

Programming
ATV programming is varied and tries to attend to all agrees and cultural groups within Peru. Among their usual programming is a morning show called "Que Tal Mañana!" hosted by Laura Borlini and comedians Fernando Armas and Hernan Vidaurre; soap operas such as Pasion de Gavilanes, El Color del Pecado or El Cuerpo del Deseo; news shows which include the daily "Primera Noticia", ATV Noticias and El Deportivo and the Sunday's Dia D; folkloric shows like Canto Andino; a movie reviews show called De Pelicula; a toddler-oriented programme called "Tu Bebe". It also broadcasts WWE shows RAW and Smackdown and its monthly pay per views. In January 2013, they started to broadcast Pablo Escobar: El Patrón del Mal, followed by El Señor de los Cielos in 2014.

Sports coverage

Association Football

Basketball

Handball

Motor Sports

Rugby

Tennis

Volleyball

Logos

References

External links
 ATV

Television networks in Peru
Spanish-language television stations
Television channels and stations established in 1983